The North Schuylkill School District is a midsized, rural/suburban public school district in Schuylkill County, Pennsylvania and Columbia County, Pennsylvania. It includes the municipalities of Frackville, Ringtown, Union Township, Girardville, Ashland, Gordon, and Butler Township in Schuylkill County, and Conyngham Township in Columbia County. The school district has a population of 16,681, according to the 2000 federal census.

Special education was provided by the district and the Schuylkill Intermediate Unit #29. Occupational training and adult education in various vocational and technical fields were provided by the district and the Schuylkill Technology Centers.

The district operates one elementary school and one junior/senior high school.

References

School districts in Schuylkill County, Pennsylvania
School districts in Columbia County, Pennsylvania